Aristotelia subericinella is a moth of the family Gelechiidae. It is found from southern and eastern Europe to the southern Ural Mountains. Outside of Europe, it is found in Turkey, the Caucasus, Central Asia and from southern Siberia eastwards to Mongolia.

The wingspan is about 11.5 mm.

References

Moths described in 1843
Aristotelia (moth)
Moths of Europe
Moths of Asia